Pelham is an unincorporated community in northwestern Caswell County, North Carolina, United States at the North Carolina/Virginia border. It is often considered a suburb of nearby Danville, Virginia. Pelham is located along Pelham Loop Road near the eastern terminus of NC 700 at US 29 (future Interstate 785). It was named for Confederate Col. John Pelham, known as "the Gallant Pelham" for his extraordinary bravery, whose parents, Dr. Atkinson and Martha Mumford McGehee Pelham, resided in neighboring Person County before moving to Alabama. Nearby  communities, independent cities, and municipalities include Danville, Eden, Ruffin, Yanceyville, Purley, Reidsville and Casville.

References

External links

Unincorporated communities in Caswell County, North Carolina
Unincorporated communities in North Carolina
Tourist attractions in Caswell County, North Carolina